Kalki TV is a Tamil-language 24/7 news television channel, owned by Kalki TV Group Asia Limited.

References

Television channels and stations established in 2001
Television stations in Chennai
2001 establishments in Tamil Nadu